A Scream in the Dark is an American comedy crime mystery directed by George Sherman and written by Anthony Coldeway and Gerald Schnitzer in 1943. The film stars Robert Lowery, Marie McDonald, Edward Brophy, Elizabeth Russell, Hobart Cavanaugh and Wally Vernon. The film was released on October 15, 1943, by Republic Pictures.It is based on the book "The Morgue is Always Open".

Plot
Eddie and Mike, a pair of Brooklyn crooks, are running a detective agency as a scam and asking for payment in advance. They mainly offer to search for missing people and find evidence on people having extramarital affairs.

Mr Norton hires them to find his missing wife and pays $1000 upfront. He is murdered soon after leaving and finding their receipt, the police interview the pair.

Mr Lackey from Texas also uses their services. He is searching for his wife Muriel, whom he thinks is living as the wife of a Leo Stark. It turns out that she has been married multiple times. Lackey ends up dead, but Eddie and Mike decide it is not Muriel.

When they visit Stark's house, he tries to kill them with a poisoned umbrella, but ends up impaled on his own umbrella. Nevertheless, Muriel is not wholly innocent as she draws a gun on Eddie. After four murders, they are asked to find the chief's wife.

Cast  
Robert Lowery as Mike Brooker
Marie McDonald as Joan Allen
Edward Brophy as Eddie Tough 
Elizabeth Russell as Muriel Kemp Norton, alias Muriel Carter Stark
Hobart Cavanaugh as Leo Stark
Wally Vernon as Klousky
Jack La Rue as Det. Lt. Cross
Frank Fenton as Sam 'Benny' Lackey
Linda Brent as Stella
William Haade as Gerald Messenger
Arthur Loft as Mr Norton 
Kitty McHugh as Maisie
Charles C. Wilson as City Editor
Ethyl May Halls as the Landlady
George Chandler as Reporter at the Morgue
Jack Rice as the Desk Clerk
Jack Raymond as the Cab Driver

References

External links
 

1943 films
1940s English-language films
American mystery films
1943 mystery films
Republic Pictures films
Films directed by George Sherman
American black-and-white films
1940s American films